Kenneth Victor Jones  (14 May 1924 – 2 December 2020) was a British film score composer.

Life
Born in Bletchley, Buckinghamshire, Jones was a scholar at King's School, Canterbury. This was followed by a 6-month RAF-sponsored course in music and philosophy at Queen's College, Oxford and, after the war, 3 years at the Royal College of Music from 1947 (of which he was later made a professor in 1958). He was a composer, founder and original conductor of The Wimbledon Symphony Orchestra and acted as one of the Governors of Rokeby School, helping to raise the £50,000 that was needed to save it from closure in 1966.

He died in December 2020 at the age of 96.

Selected filmography
 Sea Wife (1957)
 Fire Down Below (1957)
 How to Murder a Rich Uncle (1957)
 High Flight (1957)
 No Time to Die (1958)
 The Bandit of Zhobe (1959)
 Ferry to Hong Kong (1959)
 The Siege of Pinchgut (1959)
 Jazz Boat (1960)
 Oscar Wilde (1961)
 The Girl on the Boat (1961)
 The Brain (1962)
 Cairo (1963)
 Psyche 59 (1964)
 The Tomb of Ligeia (1964)
 Maroc 7 (1967)
 The Projected Man (1967)
 Whoever Slew Auntie Roo? (1971)
 Tower of Evil (1972)
 Paganini Strikes Again (1973)
 Professor Popper's Problem (1974)
 Blind Man's Bluff (1977)
 The Brute (1977)
 Leopard in the Snow (1978)

References

External links

1924 births
2020 deaths
Fellows of the Royal College of Music
People from Bletchley
British composers
British film score composers
British male film score composers
Alumni of The Queen's College, Oxford